Saga Entertainment is an independent record label, based in London, founded in 2017 by music producers Grahame and Jack Corbyn. Artists on the label include Sam Bailey, Bargain Hunt, Shona McGarty and the Celebs, a supergroup of celebrities including Frank Bruno, Shona McGarty, Kara Tointon and Lionel Blair.

History
Saga Entertainment was founded in 2017 to release "Sleigh Ride", a charity single performed by BBC antique experts Charlie Ross, James Braxton, Philip Serrell and Charles Hanson. The single was produced by Grahame and Jack Corbyn in aid of Children in Need and released under the artist name Bargain Hunt. The music video for the single was broadcast on both Christmas specials of the show.

In November 2018, the label released an original Christmas song called "Rock with Rudolph" which was to be the debut single from celebrity supergroup The Celebs. The song was written and produced by Grahame and Jack Corbyn and released in aid of Great Ormond Street Hospital and was released digitally on 30 November 2018. It included vocals by Kara Tointon, Shona McGarty, Lionel Blair and Laura Tobin. The music video debuted with The Sun on 29 November 2018 and had its first TV showing on Good Morning Britain on 30 November 2018.

"Rock with Rudolph" was followed up by another single by the Celebs; this time, Saga Entertainment recruited Frank Bruno and X Factor winner Sam Bailey. Amid the COVID-19 crisis with the intention to raise money for both Alzheimer's Society and Action for Children, they recorded a new rendition of "Merry Christmas Everyone" by Shakin' Stevens, released digitally on 11 December 2020 and including vocals by Kellie Shirley, Toby Anstis, Faye Barker, The Sacconejolys and others. The music video debuted on Good Morning Britain the day before release.

In 2021, Sam Bailey signed a record deal with Saga Entertainment; the first single resulting from this deal was released on 6 August 2021, a cover of the Alannah Myles hit single "Black Velvet".

Later the same year, Saga Entertainment reunited with The Celebs to record a cover of The Beatles classic Let It Be (Beatles song), a song produced by Grahame and Jack Corbyn assisted by Stephen Large. The song was recorded at Metropolis Studios, in support of Mind (charity) and released on 3rd December 2021. Saga Entertainment recruited Shona McGarty to sing the lead vocal backed by The Celebs which included Georgia Hirst, Anne Hegerty, Ivan Kaye and Eunice Olumide, amongst others.

In January 2022 Saga Entertainment followed up Sam Bailey’s Rock debut with a powerful cover of Stevie Nicks’ Edge Of Seventeen, the song was accompanied by an animated music video.

Edge Of Seventeen was swiftly followed up in April with a cover of Meat Loaf’s much loved rock ballad I'd Do Anything for Love (But I Won't Do That), this release was also accompanied by an animated music video. The song was produced by Grahame and Jack Corbyn at Metropolis Studios, leading lady of Bat Out of Hell: The Musical Christina Bennington was recruited on backing vocals.

In July 2022, Saga Entertainment became manager to Jo O'Meara.

Artists

Current
 Jo O'Meara
 The Celebs
 Sam Bailey
 Shona McGarty

Past
 Bargain Hunt

Discography
 Bargain Hunt - "Sleigh Ride" (2017)
 The Celebs - "Rock with Rudolph" (2018)
 The Celebs - "Merry Christmas Everyone" (2020)
 Sam Bailey - "Black Velvet" (2021)
 Shona McGarty & The Celebs - “Let It Be” (2021)
 Sam Bailey - "Edge Of Seventeen" (2022)
 Sam Bailey - "I'd Do Anything for Love (But I Won't Do That)" (2022)
 Jo O'Meara & The Celebs - “Thriller” (2022)

See Also
List of independent UK record labels

References

External links
 Official site
 Saga Entertainment at Discogs
 Saga Entertainment at IMDb

British independent record labels
British companies established in 2017
Companies based in London
Film production companies of the United Kingdom
Mass media companies of the United Kingdom
Publishing companies based in London
Publishing companies established in 2003